Morse is a town in southern Saskatchewan, Canada. It is situated on the Trans Canada Highway near the north shore of Reed Lake. The town is named after the American scholar and inventor Samuel Morse, best known for the invention of the telegraph based on the European telegraph system. Although he was an American, he left a large enough impression that the town was named after him.

Demographics 

See also 

 List of communities in Saskatchewan
 List of towns in Saskatchewan

References

External links

Towns in Saskatchewan
Morse No. 165, Saskatchewan